Cannflavins are a group of chemical compounds found in Cannabis sativa. Chemically, they are prenylflavonoids and are unrelated to THC and other cannabinoids.  Cannflavins A and B were first identified in the 1980s and cannflavin C was identified in 2008.

Because cannflavins A and B are inhibitors of prostaglandin E2 production in vitro, the cannflavins have been studied for their potential use as anti-inflammatory agents.

Biosynthesis 

Cannflavins A and B are biosynthesized by prenylation of chrysoeriol.

References

Prenylflavonoids